Skerne is a village in the East Riding of Yorkshire, England. It forms part of the civil parish of Skerne and Wansford.

Skerne Grade I listed Anglican church is dedicated to St Leonard. The church is substantially Norman, particularly the nave, chancel and south doorway. The north aisle is 13th-century. The Perpendicular tower is ashlar faced. Three interior effigies, possibly, according to Pevsner, 12th- or 13th-century, are opposite the church door: a cross-legged knight holding a small shield, a woman shown within a quatrefoil, and between these a baby.

In 1823 Skerne inhabitants numbered 251. Occupations included eleven farmers, a tailor, a flax dresser who was also a corn miller, and the landlord of the Board public house.

Skerne public house, The Eagle, closed in 2004. It was one of only 11 left in the UK without a bar counter, and served beer through a set of cash register handpulls. Prior to that beer was drawn directly from the barrels in the cellar and brought up in enamel jugs
 Planning permission was granted in 2011 for conversion to residential usage. The Eagle is Grade II listed by Historic England.

References

External links

"Skerne: Geographical and Historical information from the year 1892." (Bulmers'), Genuki.org.uk. Retrieved 16 April 2012
 

Villages in the East Riding of Yorkshire